Master is a Big Finish Productions audio drama based on the long-running British science fiction television series Doctor Who. It forms a trilogy with Omega and Davros to celebrate the 40th anniversary of the show. It features the Seventh Doctor as its main character.

Synopsis
The Seventh Doctor arrives at an old house on the colony world of Perfugium where he has, through a deal with Death, sent the Master to live without memory of his evil for several years.

It is eventually revealed that while the Doctor was Time's Champion, the Master was Death's. This was a result of an incident in their youth, when the Doctor accidentally killed a boy who was bullying the young Master. When Death came to him, the young Doctor gave his childhood friend over to Death (personified as a woman) rather than become its slave himself, causing his friend to take on all the guilt and aftereffects for his crime and ultimately become the Master.

However, as a result of this, neither the Master nor the Doctor remembered the truth, instead having the false memory of the Master being responsible for the death. The deal the Doctor made involved Death allowing the Master to be what he would have been if he had not become her avatar, but in return the Doctor would have to kill him ten years later.

Rendered amnesiac and thinking his name was John Smith, the Master becomes a benevolent doctor on Perfugum. At the end of those years, however, Doctor is unable to bring himself to kill him. This causes Death to become personally involved, unleashing a night of horrors upon the household. The truth of the Master's past is revealed, but "John Smith" forgives the Doctor for this. However, the end implies that the Master will once again become Death's servant.

Cast
The Doctor — Sylvester McCoy
The Master — Geoffrey Beevers
Man — Daniel Barzotti
Child — Joe Bassett
Jade — Charlie Hayes
Victor Schaeffer — Philip Madoc
Jacqueline Schaeffer — Anne Ridler

Notes
This story is part of a trilogy with Omega and Davros to celebrate the 40th anniversary of Doctor Who.
Geoffrey Beevers reprises the role of the Master, whom he previously played in the 1981 story The Keeper of Traken and the Big Finish Productions audio play Dust Breeding.  He returns to the role in Trail of the White Worm.
The Master spends most of the play in his "John Smith" personality. However, when his true personality briefly surfaces, he is quite contemptuous of the idea that Death had anything to do with his creation. The Master scoffs at the idea of being Death's Champion, casually tells her to be quiet and generally dismisses her. This may imply that Death is exaggerating her role in the Master's formation.
Since the Master is using the Doctor's usual pseudonym, the latter professes his name to be Vaughan Sutton, the villain he faced in Excelis Decays.
The personification of Death had previously appeared in the Virgin New Adventures line of books, and this story, although it is set after that line of books, shares much of its tone with them.
Death tells the Doctor that she knows what is inside his head and sings a paraphrased version of the Zagreus nursery rhyme, foreshadowing future events.
Philip Madoc appeared in the Doctor Who movie Daleks – Invasion Earth: 2150 A.D.. He also had several roles in the television series. In the 1960s he appeared in two Second Doctor serials, The Krotons and The War Games and in the 1970s he appeared in two Fourth Doctor serials, The Brain of Morbius and The Power of Kroll.  He returned to Big Finish in the 2008 Sixth Doctor story Return of the Krotons.

External links

Big Finish Productions – The Master

2003 audio plays
Seventh Doctor audio plays
Master